Celine Dion Live 2018 was the thirteenth concert tour by Canadian singer Celine Dion to support her greatest hits album, The Best So Far... 2018 Tour Edition (2018). It marked Dion's first concerts in Asia and Oceania since the Taking Chances World Tour in 2008. The tour began on 26 June 2018 in Tokyo, Japan and concluded on 14 August 2018 in Auckland, New Zealand, making a total of 22 concerts performed. The tour was sold-out and grossed $56.5 million.

Background
The initial Asia Tour was planned to support the English language album Loved Me Back to Life and was scheduled to take place in October and November 2014. Several dates were planned in Japan, the Philippines, China, Taiwan, South Korea, Malaysia and Thailand. On 13 August 2014, Dion announced that the tour has been cancelled due to ongoing illness of her husband and manager, René Angélil, and family issues.

On 10 January 2018, Dion held a press conference at The Colosseum at Caesars Palace in Las Vegas, where she announced the tour to the journalists. She said she will visit Japan, Taiwan, Singapore, Indonesia, Thailand, China and the Philippines. Except for Japan and China, it was Dion's first time in these countries. On 25 January 2018, a third date was added in Taipei due to overwhelming demand. On 12 February 2018, a second date was added in Manila.

On 1 February 2018, the Australia and New Zealand leg was announced. On 14 February 2018, more dates in Sydney, Melbourne and Auckland were added. On 19 February 2018, an additional date in Brisbane was added. On 11 March 2018, it was announced that Dion would be performing a third date in Auckland on 14 August 2018.

Critical reception
The tour received positive reviews. Nick Bond from news.com.au wrote that Dion was heartbreaking and hilarious, and that her surprise inclusion of the Australian classic "You're the Voice" made the Sydney show. He also praised the performance of "All by Myself", calling it a raw emotion. According to Jade Kops from BroadwayWorld.com, a decade since Dion's last Sydney visit, she did not disappoint. He praised her voice and wrote that she delivered a stadium concert that was surprisingly intimate, sharing songs and stories from her 30+ year career. Kops also noted that Dion's cover of Janis Ian's "At Seventeen", supported by an intimate string quartet, was given a wonderful restraint in her phrasing expressing an honesty and connection to the work. In another review, Jane Armistead from The Sunday Times wrote that Dion raised the roof rolling out hit after hit at the Brisbane Entertainment Centre. Armistead also noted that it wasn't without its emotion as Dion sang "Recovering", a track written for her by Pink after Angélil's death in 2016.

Ross McRae from The West Australian gave the concert in Perth four stars and highlighted "Think Twice" (rocked out by Dion and her guitarist), "All by Myself" (Dion's signature power ballad complete with its goosebump-inducing vocal finale) and a poignant medley of "At Seventeen", "A New Day Has Come" and "Unison". McRae also noted that unlike most pop singers, Dion uses an old school corded microphone as she works the stage, which adds a dramatic effect that emphasises she is singing live. Another reviewer, Michael Lallo from The Age stated that Dion is deeply uncool, and that's what makes her great. During her Melbourne concert Dion sang covers which she made her own, including "It's All Coming Back to Me Now" in which she demonstrated the undimmed strength of her voice. Allo noted that all the hits were there, including show-stopping "My Heart Will Go On" and that Dion promised to come back sooner to Australia than the last time.

Commercial reception
Dion brought her 2018 summer tour to a close with grosses of $56.5 million. Played across 22 shows in Asia, Australia, and New Zealand, she has sold 259,443 tickets. The biggest engagement of the tour was a three-night stay at Taiwan's Taipei Arena with over $10.7 million grossed, though her one show at the Tokyo Dome delivered the biggest attendance tally, at 42,748.
On 12 July 2019, it was announced, that Dion's Live 2018 tour was nominated at the Helpmann awards, for best International Contemporary Concert.

Broadcasts and recordings
The first concert of the tour which took place in Tokyo was recorded and broadcast on 25 August 2018. "Falling into You" and "Pour que tu m'aimes encore" were not included in the broadcast. There has been no confirmation regarding possible CD/DVD release. The performance of "You're the Voice" with John Farnham was recorded and part of it aired on Channel Ten's The Project.

Band

 Musical Director, Piano: Scott Price
 Drums: Dominique Messier
 Bass: Yves Labonté
 Guitars: Kaven Girouard
 Keyboards: Guillaume Marchand 
 Percussion: Paul Picard 
 Tin Whistle: Andrea Corr
 Background Vocals: Barnev Valsaint, Dawn Cumberbatch, Élise Duguay
 Violins: Philippe Dunnigan, Jenny Elfving
 Viola: Jerome Gordon
 Cello: Judy Kang
 Woodwinds: Eric Tewalt, Kendall Louis Armstrong
 Trumpets: Matt Fronke, Kail Graham, Jay Martin
 Trombone: Nathan Tanouye

Set list

Notes
On 8 and 9 June 2018 Dion completely changed the setlist of her Las Vegas show in order to rehearse for her Live 2018 tour. Additionally, the rehearsals included "I Drove All Night" and the order of "That's the Way It Is" and "I'm Alive" was reversed.
"Can't Help Falling in Love" was added as the final encore since Taipei, 13 July 2018
"You're the Voice" replaced "The Reason" since Sydney on 27 July 2018
John Farnham joined Dion for her last Australian concert to perform "You're the Voice" together in Melbourne on 8 August 2018 
Source:

Tour dates

See also
The Best So Far... 2018 Tour Edition

References

2018 concert tours
Celine Dion concert tours